Who's Gonna Play This Old Piano...Think About It, Darlin' is an album by Jerry Lee Lewis that was released on Mercury Records in 1972.

Recording
Lewis's second album of 1972 not only had a different sound from its predecessor, The Killer Rocks On, but also from the country albums like Another Place, Another Time and She Still Comes Around (To Love What's Left Of Me) that had ushered in his comeback; unlike those records, which possess a stripped down, "hardcore" sound, Who's Gonna Play This Old Piano...Think About It, Darlin''' is far more in tune with the smoother, countrypolitan sound that began dominating country radio in the early seventies. "She's Reaching for My Mind", "Too Many Rivers", and "No Traffic Out of Abilene" all contain strings and an array of background vocalists as producer Jerry Kennedy attempted to give the tracks as contemporary a feel as possible.

Although the album did reach number three on the Billboard country albums chart, it signified the beginning of the end as far as Lewis's incredible run on the singles chart was concerned, with the Dixieland-infused title track stalling at number 14. Although he would continue to have the odd hit country single, they would come at a more infrequent rate, as songwriters began providing Lewis with material so tailor-made that they began verging on self-parody. In his 2014 authorized biography, Jerry Lee Lewis: His Own Story'', Rick Bragg comments that eager tune-smiths "obliged with a slew of new material that fit perfectly with his voice and leather-worn persona. Some of them actually were created for him - like 'Think About It, Darlin',' written to capitalize on one of his catchphrases." Lewis was likely inspired to record "Walls Around Heaven" because of his mother's death the previous year. The song, in which the singer condemns his own sinful ways, also reflects Lewis's ongoing struggle to come to terms with his faith and his lifestyle which, by all accounts, got more and more out of control as the decade wore on.

Track listing

Personnel
Jerry Lee Lewis - vocals, piano
Chip Young, Dale Sellers, Harold Bradley, Jerry Kennedy, Pete Wade, Ray Edenton - guitar
Pete Drake - steel guitar
Kenny Lovelace - fiddle
Bob Moore - bass
Bill Strom - organ
Buddy Harman - drums
Bob Phillips - trumpet
Wayne Butler - trombone
Stephen Sefsik - clarinet
Carol Montgomery, Dolores Edgin, Hurshel Wiginton, Joe Babcock, Millie Kirkham, Rickie Page, Trish Williams - vocal accompaniment 
Cam Mullins - arrangements

1972 albums
Jerry Lee Lewis albums
Albums produced by Jerry Kennedy
Mercury Records albums